John Fawcett (of Bolton) (8 December 1789 – 26 October 1867) began in life as a shoemaker but taught himself to be a musician, at Bolton-le-moors. In 1825, Fawcett moved to Bolton, in Lancashire, and became an organist, choir leader, and composer. He composed three sets of Psalm and Hymn Tunes, published at various periods under the titles of The Voice of Devotion, The Harp of Zion, The Cherub Lute, and Miriam's Timbrel (1862), which are still very popular in Lancashire. In 1840 he edited and arranged the accompaniments the collection of psalm and hymn tunes and other pieces selected by Joseph Hart, the music publisher, entitled Melodia Divina. An oratorio of his composition, called Paradise, was published in 1853. He died at Bolton, Oct. 26,1867.

References 

English classical composers
English classical organists
British male organists
Shoemakers
Classical composers of church music
People from Bolton
1789 births
1867 deaths
English male classical composers
19th-century English musicians
19th-century British male musicians
Male classical organists
19th-century organists